Delaunay is a lunar impact crater. It was named after French astronomer Charles-Eugène Delaunay. The craters La Caille to the southwest and Faye to the northeast border on the outer rim of Delaunay. Further to the northwest is the prominent Arzachel.

This is an irregular crater formation that has an interior ridge running from the northeast side that divides the crater nearly in half, and gives it a heart-shaped appearance. This ridge grows increasingly slender as it approaches the southwest rim, until it terminates at sharp point, giving it the appearance of a curved fang. The outer rim of this crater is equally irregular, and the uneven inner wall varies significantly in width. The southern rim has been heavily damaged by impacts, including La Caille E which intrudes into the interior.

Satellite craters
By convention these features are identified on lunar maps by placing the letter on the side of the crater midpoint that is closest to Delaunay.

References

External links

Delaunay at The Moon Wiki

Impact craters on the Moon